Fjärilar i magen is the seventh studio album by Swedish singer/songwriter Darin, released on 25 September 2015 by his own record label Dex Music and distributed by Sony Music. It is the first album by Darin to entirely consist of Swedish songs. The album peaked at number one on the Swedish Albums Chart and was certified platinum.

The album was inspired by folk-music, a genre that marked new territory for Darin. Fjärilar i magen was recorded in the Atlantis Studio in Stockholm.

Background 
After participating in the recording of a tribute album for the late musician Ted Gärdestad, in which Darin sang in Swedish, he wanted to make an album containing Swedish songs. He was also  interested in creating Swedish music after he participated in the Swedish show Så mycket bättre, in which he sang Swedish songs.

Critical reception 
Fjärilar i magen received generally mixed reviews from Swedish music critics, with many praising the first half of the album while criticizing the second half.

Track listing 
Credits adapted from Spotify.

Personnel 
Credits adapted from Spotify.

 Darin Zanyar  – vocals, production, songwriting 
 David Lindgren Zacharias – production , songwriting 
Ollie Olson – production , songwriting 
Peter Kvint –  songwriting .
Tony Nilsson – songwriting

Charts

Weekly charts

Year-end charts

Certifications

Release history

References 

2015 albums
Darin (singer) albums
Swedish-language albums